Bakana is a town in Nigeria.  It is one of the largest towns of the kalabari people, located in the Degema LGA of Rivers State.

References

Populated places in Rivers State